Ngāti Porou ki Hauraki or Ngāti Porou ki Harataunga ki Mataora is a Māori iwi of New Zealand. The chairman for Ngāti Porou ki Hauraki is John Tamihere who became known for fighting for their rights of having two parts of Coromandel Peninsula.

See also
List of Māori iwi

References